Civitella Roveto is a comune and town in the province of L'Aquila in the Abruzzo region of central Italy.

Geography 
The town isin the Marsica region, located in the center of the Roveto valley, on the slopes of the Cantari mountains under the Mount Viglio (2 156 m). The ancient nucleus of Civitella Roveto was on the western side of the Liri River.

Twin towns
Civitella Roveto is twinned with:

  Cessieu, France
  Domașnea, Romania
  Erythres, Greece

References

Cities and towns in Abruzzo
Marsica